The Guangdong Science Center (GDSC) is a major science center established in 2008 in Guangzhou, Guangdong, China.

Overview 

The science center has the slogan of "Get close to Science, Embrace the Future." The science center set the goals of becoming the "First class venue of science activity in the world", "Biggest base of popular science education in Asia" and becoming a "Large platform of technology communication in Guangdong.

History 

Costing 1.9 billion yuan, Guangdong Science Center was built within a 5-year period of time. The Lighting Ceremony was held on Sept.19, 2008, and the opening ceremony was held on Sept., 26, 2008. Guangdong Science Center opened to public on Sept., 27, 2008.

As a member of Asia Pacific Network of Science and Technology Centres(ASPAC), Guangdong Science Center held the Annual Conference in 2011, the Xiaoguwei Science Forum won the 2014 ASPAC Creative Science Communication Award, Eyes on the World exhibition won the 2014 ASPAC Creative Exhibit Award.

Transportation 

Bus: No. 35, No. 801, No. 383, No. (PAN)202 and Holiday Line 5

Subway: Line 4 of Guangzhou Metro, then transfer to Bus No. 383 or No. 801 at Exit A of Higher Education Mega Center North Station.

References 

Science centers
Technology museums in China
Science museums in China
Guangzhou Higher Education Mega Center
Panyu District